Pioneer Mall is a 4-storey neighbourhood shopping centre in Jurong West, Singapore.

Housing and Development Board set up a HDB Pioneer Service Centre at the shopping centre. Most of the shopping mall is leased by the hypermarket chain Giant. Pioneer Mall serves residents mainly living near the Pioneer MRT station. There is also a McDonald's fast food restaurant in the mall.

This is where activities are often held to bond the community together, through activities organised by the HDB,  the South West CDC and West Coast Town Council.

References 

Places in Singapore
Jurong West
Pioneer, Singapore